The ever buree (Mongolian: эвэр бүрээ) is a Mongolian musical instrument, part of the clarinet family. Despite the fact that its name translates to "horn - trumpet", it has the timbre of a basset horn (an F alto clarinet with a range down to low C).

In terms of construction, it is an almost cylindrical tube made of black ebony, curved in a circular manner to allow the bell of the instrument to slip underneath the player's right arm. A mouthpiece (usually a saxophone mouthpiece) with a single reed is attached at the upper end of the tube. The keywork is made of brass and shares similarities with the German Oehler system, since it has rolls to slide from one key to the next. Like all clarinets, it has a speaker key, which facilitates the production of the upper harmonics, elevating the tone by a 12th.

The ever buree was invented in the 1970s, and frequently appears as part of the standard Mongolian orchestra, which typically has nine members.

External links
Music meshes nine cultures, Korea.net

Mongolian musical instruments